Still Life was an album by Tasmanian rock band The Paradise Motel. It was released to largely positive reviews in 1996.

Later copies of the album were accompanied by the bonus CD Junk Mail, a half-hour instrumental soundscape.

Themes
This album began the band's interest in disappearances and landscape. Two singles were taken from the album, 'Bad Light' and 'Calling You'. It is still regarded as one of the band's most popular albums, and live sets still feature many songs from it. The album followed on from the EP Left Over Life To Kill released several months earlier, and is considered their debut.

Track listing

Personnel 
Mérida Sussex - vocals
Matt Bailey - bass
Matt Aulich - guitars
BJ Austin - organ, pedal steel
Tim O'Shannassy - drums
Charles Bickford - guitar, organ, percussion

Lyrics were written by Charles Bickford, string arrangements were composed by Matt Aulich.

References

1996 albums
The Paradise Motel albums
Mushroom Records albums